Wolfaardt v Fedlife Assurance Ltd is an important, precedent-setting case in South African labour law, decided by Odendaal AJ on August 31, 1999. It was heard in the Witwatersrand Local Division.

Facts 
The plaintiff sued the defendant for damages arising from an alleged repudiation of the plaintiff's contract of employment by the defendant. The defendant filed a special plea based on the Labour Court's exclusive jurisdiction to hear such matters in terms of section 157(1) of the Labour Relations Act. The plaintiff then excepted to the special plea on the basis that it disclosed no defence. The plaintiff's argument was that its claim was based on simple breach of contract and damages flowing therefrom.

Judgment 
The court that the crucial question was whether the ordinary civil courts, in light of the provisions of the Labour Relations Act, retained their jurisdiction to hear common-law contractual breaches of contracts of employment. The court found itself to be bound by a recent decision which appeared to be on all fours with the present case: That decision held that the simple enforcement of a contract of employment is not a matter falling within the exclusive jurisdiction of the Labour Court. Being unconvinced that this decision was wrong, the court followed it.

The Labour Relations Act was held to distinguish between the remedies of compensation and damages, both of which it was empowered to order. Awards of compensation were dealt with specifically, while that of damages was not. This being the case, the court held that damages did not fall within the exclusive jurisdiction of the Labour Court.

See also 
 Action (law)
 South African civil procedure
 South African labour law
 South African private law

References

Case law 
 Coin Security Group Limited v SA National Union for Security Officers and other Workers and Others [1998] 19 ILJ 43 (C).
 Independent Municipal & Allied Trade Union v Northern Pretoria Metropolitan Substructure and Others [1999] 20 ILJ 1018 (T).
 Jacot-Guillarmod v The Gauteng Provincial Government and Another, Transvaal Provincial Division, unreported, case 8499/98.
 Mondi Paper (A Division of Mondi Limited) v Paper Printing Wood and Allied Workers’ Union and Others [1997] 18 ILJ 84 (D).
 Sappi Fine Papers (Pty) Limited (Adamas Mill) v Paper Printing Wood and Allied Workers' Union and Others [1998] 19 ILJ 246 (SE).
 Wolfaardt v Fedlife Assurance Ltd [2000] JOL 6513 (W).

Statutes 
Labour Relations Act 66 of 1999

Notes 

Gauteng Division cases
1999 in South African law
1999 in case law
South African labour case law